Pratap Nagar is one of the largest residential areas in Jaipur, India. It is located on NH 12 (locally known as Tonk Road). It is one of the fastest-growing areas in Jaipur.

It is 8 km away from Jaipur International Airport and 9 km away from nearest railway station (Durgapura railway station). Pratap Nagar is an area of interest for Rajasthan Housing Board and JDA (Jaipur Development Authority) for constructions and development.

Health 
 RUHS
Narayana Hrudayalaya
Prakash Mother and Child Hospital
Star Hospital
Gopi Nath Hospital
Balaji ENT Hospital, sector 11
Narayana Multispecialty Hospital

Education

Schools
 Bharatiya Vidya Bhavan Vidyashram
 MPS Pratap Nagar
 Jankidevi Public School
 VSPK Public School
 Subodh Public School
 JVP International School Pratap Nagar Jaipur
 Saint Soldier School
 Kendriya Vidyalaya No. 6, Jaipur
 LBS Public School
 Dolphins International School
Rawat Public School Pratap Nagar Jaipur
 St. Sheetal Royal Academy
 Calorx Public School
 Shree Ram Global School
 VSI International School
 First Step Public School
St. Joseph Convent School, Pratap nagar sector 7 jaipur

Colleges 
Tirupati College
Maheshwari College of Commerce and Arts
Government Women's Polytechnic College
 S.K.H. Medical College Jaipur
 St. Joseph T.T. college, sec. No.7 JAIPUR

8 SEC.

Online News Portals 
The Viral Rush Media

References

Neighbourhoods in Jaipur
Areas of Jaipur